Chemical oxidation may refer to:
Redox reactions, which involving oxidation and reduction of chemicals
In situ oxidation, an environmental remediation technique